Pontibacter locisalis  is a Gram-negative, rod-shaped, aerobic and non-motile bacterium from the genus of Pontibacter which has been isolated from a marine saltern from Weihai in China.

References 

Cytophagia
Bacteria described in 2016